Georgia Branch is a  long 2nd order tributary to the Cape Fear River in Bladen County, North Carolina.

Course
Georgia Branch rises in Burrells Bay about 2 miles north of Tobermory, North Carolina. Georgia Branch then flows southeast to join the Cape Fear River about 2 miles east of Tobermory.

Watershed
Georgia Branch drains  of area, receives about 48.8 in/year of precipitation, has a wetness index of 590.29 and is about 21% forested.

See also
List of rivers of North Carolina

References

Rivers of North Carolina
Rivers of Bladen County, North Carolina
Tributaries of the Cape Fear River